This is a list of the mammal species recorded in Ecuador. There are 317 mammal species in Ecuador, of which two are critically endangered, ten are endangered, twenty-three are vulnerable, and seven are near threatened.
Two of the species listed for Ecuador are considered to be extinct.

The following tags are used to highlight each species' conservation status as assessed by the International Union for Conservation of Nature:

Some species were assessed using an earlier set of criteria. Species assessed using this system have the following instead of near threatened and least concern categories:

Subclass: Theria

Infraclass: Eutheria

Order: Sirenia (manatees and dugongs)

Sirenia is an order of fully aquatic, herbivorous mammals that inhabit rivers, estuaries, coastal marine waters, swamps, and marine wetlands. All four species are endangered.

Family: Trichechidae
Genus: Trichechus
 Amazonian manatee, T. inunguis

Order: Cingulata (armadillos)

The armadillos are small mammals with a bony armored shell. They are native to the Americas. There are around 20 extant species.

Family: Dasypodidae (armadillos)
Subfamily: Dasypodinae
Genus: Dasypus
 Greater long-nosed armadillo, Dasypus kappleri LC
 Nine-banded armadillo, Dasypus novemcinctus LC
Subfamily: Tolypeutinae
Genus: Cabassous
 Southern naked-tailed armadillo, Cabassous unicinctus LC
Genus: Priodontes
 Giant armadillo, Priodontes maximus VU

Order: Pilosa (anteaters, sloths and tamanduas)

The order Pilosa is extant only in the Americas and includes the anteaters, sloths, and tamanduas.

Suborder: Folivora
Family: Bradypodidae (three-toed sloths)
Genus: Bradypus
 Brown-throated three-toed sloth, Bradypus variegatus LC
Family: Choloepodidae (two-toed sloths)
Genus: Choloepus
 Linnaeus's two-toed sloth, Choloepus didactylus LC
 Hoffmann's two-toed sloth, Choloepus hoffmanni LC
Suborder: Vermilingua
Family: Cyclopedidae
Genus: Cyclopes
 Silky anteater, C. didactylus LC
Central American silky anteater, C. dorsalis 
Family: Myrmecophagidae (American anteaters)
Genus: Myrmecophaga
 Giant anteater, Myrmecophaga tridactyla NT
Genus: Tamandua
 Northern tamandua, Tamandua mexicana LC
 Southern tamandua, Tamandua tetradactyla LC

Order: Primates

The order Primates contains humans and their closest relatives: lemurs, lorisoids, monkeys, and apes.

Suborder: Haplorhini
Infraorder: Simiiformes
Parvorder: Platyrrhini (New World monkeys)
Family: Cebidae
Subfamily: Callitrichinae
Genus: Callithrix
 Pygmy marmoset, Cebuella pygmaea LC
Genus: Leontocebus
 Red-mantled saddle-back tamarin, Leontocebus lagonotus LC
 Black-mantled tamarin, Leontocebus nigricollis LC
 Golden-mantled tamarin, Leontocebus tripartitus LC
Subfamily: Cebinae
Genus: Cebus
 Ecuadorian capuchin, Cebus aequatorialis CR
 Colombian white-faced capuchin, Cebus capucinus LC
 Marañón white-fronted capuchin, Cebus yuracus
Genus: Sapajus
 Large-headed capuchin, Sapajus macrocephalus LC
Genus: Saimiri
 Humboldt's squirrel monkey, Saimiri cassiquiarensis 
Family: Aotidae
Genus: Aotus
 Gray-bellied night monkey, Aotus lemurinus VU
 Spix's night monkey, Aotus vociferans LC
Family: Pitheciidae
Subfamily: Callicebinae
Genus: Callicebus
 White-tailed titi, Callicebus discolor LC
 Lucifer titi, Callicebus lucifer LC
Subfamily: Pitheciinae
Genus: Pithecia
 Equatorial saki, Pithecia aequatorialis LR/lc
 Monk saki, Pithecia monachus LC
Family: Atelidae
Subfamily: Alouattinae
Genus: Alouatta
 Mantled howler, Alouatta palliata LC
 Venezuelan red howler, Alouatta seniculus LC
Subfamily: Atelinae
Genus: Ateles
 White-fronted spider monkey, Ateles belzebuth VU
 Black-headed spider monkey, Ateles fusciceps CR
Genus: Lagothrix
 Brown woolly monkey, Lagothrix lagothricha LR/lc
 Silvery woolly monkey, Lagothrix poeppigii NT

Order: Rodentia (rodents)

Rodents make up the largest order of mammals, with over 40% of mammalian species. They have two incisors in the upper and lower jaw which grow continually and must be kept short by gnawing.

Suborder: Hystricognathi
Family: Erethizontidae (New World porcupines)
Subfamily: Erethizontinae
Genus: Coendou
 Bicolor-spined porcupine, Coendou bicolor LR/lc
Family: Dinomyidae (pacarana)
Genus: Dinomys
 Pacarana, Dinomys branickii EN
Family: Caviidae (guinea pigs)
Subfamily: Caviinae
Genus: Cavia
 Brazilian guinea pig, Cavia aperea LR/lc
 Guinea pig, Cavia porcellus LR/lc
Family: Dasyproctidae (agoutis and pacas)
Genus: Dasyprocta
 Black agouti, Dasyprocta fuliginosa LR/lc
 Central American agouti, Dasyprocta punctata LR/lc
Genus: Myoprocta
 Red acouchi, Myoprocta acouchy LR/lc
 Red acouchi, Myoprocta exilis DD
Family: Cuniculidae
Genus: Cuniculus
 Lowland paca, Cuniculus paca LC
 Mountain paca, Cuniculus taczanowskii LR/nt
Family: Echimyidae
Subfamily: Dactylomyinae
Genus: Dactylomys
 Amazon bamboo rat, Dactylomys dactylinus LR/lc
Subfamily: Echimyinae
Genus: Diplomys
 Colombian soft-furred spiny rat, Diplomys caniceps LR/nt
Genus: Echimys
 Dark spiny tree-rat, Echimys saturnus LR/lc
Genus: Makalata
 Brazilian spiny tree-rat, Makalata didelphoides LR/lc
 Bare-tailed armored tree-rat, Makalata occasius CR
Subfamily: Eumysopinae
Genus: Hoplomys
 Armored rat, Hoplomys gymnurus LR/lc
Genus: Mesomys
 Ferreira's spiny tree rat, Mesomys hispidus LR/lc
Genus: Proechimys
 Pacific spiny rat, Proechimys decumanus LR/lc
 Short-tailed spiny rat, Proechimys brevicauda LR/lc
 Napo spiny rat, Proechimys quadruplicatus LR/lc
 Tome's spiny-rat, Proechimys semispinosus LR/lc
 Simon's spiny rat, Proechimys simonsi LR/lc
Suborder: Sciurognathi
Family: Sciuridae (squirrels)
Subfamily: Sciurinae
Tribe: Sciurini
Genus: Microsciurus
 Amazon dwarf squirrel, Microsciurus flaviventer LR/lc
 Western dwarf squirrel, Microsciurus mimulus LR/lc
Genus: Sciurus
 Red-tailed squirrel, Sciurus granatensis LR/lc
 Northern Amazon red squirrel, Sciurus igniventris LR/lc
 Southern Amazon red squirrel, Sciurus spadiceus LR/lc
 Guayaquil squirrel, Sciurus stramineus LR/lc
Family: Heteromyidae
Subfamily: Heteromyinae
Genus: Heteromys
 Southern spiny pocket mouse, Heteromys australis LR/lc
Family: Cricetidae
Subfamily: Tylomyinae
Genus: Tylomys
 Mira climbing rat, Tylomys mirae LR/lc
Subfamily: Neotominae
Genus: Reithrodontomys
 Mexican harvest mouse, Reithrodontomys mexicanus LR/lc
Subfamily: Sigmodontinae
Genus: Aegialomys
 Galápagos rice rat, Aegialomys galapagoensis VU
 Yellowish rice rat, Aegialomys xantheolus LR/lc
Genus: Aepeomys
 Olive montane mouse, Aepeomys lugens LR/lc
Genus: Akodon
 Highland grass mouse, Akodon aerosus LR/lc
 Ecuadorian grass mouse, Akodon latebricola LR/lc
 Soft grass mouse, Akodon mollis LR/lc
Genus: Anotomys
 Aquatic rat, Anotomys leander EN
Genus: Chilomys
 Colombian forest mouse, Chilomys instans LR/lc
Genus: Euryoryzomys
 MacConnell's rice rat, Euryoryzomys macconnelli LR/lc
Genus: Handleyomys
 Alfaro's rice rat, Handleyomys alfaroi LR/lc
Genus: Holochilus
 Amazonian marsh rat, Holochilus sciureus LR/lc
Genus: Hylaeamys
 Western Amazonian oryzomys, Hylaeamys perenensis LC
 Tate's oryzomys, Hylaeamys tatei DD
 Amazonian oryzomys, Hylaeamys yunganus LC
Genus: Ichthyomys
 Crab-eating rat, Ichthyomys hydrobates LR/nt
 Stolzmann's crab-eating rat, Ichthyomys stolzmanni LR/lc
 Tweedy's crab-eating rat, Ichthyomys tweedii LR/lc
Genus: Melanomys
 Dusky rice rat, Melanomys caliginosus LR/lc
 Robust dark rice rat, Melanomys robustulus LR/lc
Genus: Microryzomys
 Highland small rice rat, Microryzomys altissimus LR/lc
 Forest small rice rat, Microryzomys minutus LR/lc
Genus: Mindomys
 Hammond's rice rat, Mindomys hammondi LR/lc
Genus: Neacomys
 Common neacomys, Neacomys spinosus LR/lc
 Narrow-footed bristly mouse, Neacomys tenuipes LR/lc
Genus: Necromys
 Spotted bolo mouse, Necromys punctulatus LR/lc
Genus: Nectomys
 Western Amazonian nectomys, Nectomys apicalis
Genus: Nephelomys
 Tomes's rice rat, Nephelomys albigularis LR/lc
 Golden-bellied oryzomys, Nephelomys auriventer LR/lc
Genus: Nesoryzomys
 Darwin's rice rat, Nesoryzomys darwini EX
 Fernandina rice rat, Nesoryzomys fernandinae VU
 Indefatigable Galapagos mouse, Nesoryzomys indefessus EX
 Fernandina Island Galapagos mouse, Nesoryzomys narboroughi NT
 Santiago Galapagos mouse, Nesoryzomys swarthi VU
Genus: Neusticomys
 Montane fish-eating rat, Neusticomys monticolus LR/lc
Genus: Oecomys
 Bicolored arboreal rice rat, Oecomys bicolor LR/lc
 Foothill arboreal rice rat, Oecomys superans LR/lc
Genus: Oligoryzomys
 Destructive pygmy rice rat, Oligoryzomys destructor DD
 Fulvous pygmy rice rat, Oligoryzomys fulvescens LR/lc
Genus: Oreoryzomys
 Peruvian rice rat, Oreoryzomys balneator LR/lc
Genus: Phyllotis
 Andean leaf-eared mouse, Phyllotis andium LR/lc
 Haggard's leaf-eared mouse, Phyllotis haggardi LR/lc
Genus: Rhipidomys
 Coues's climbing mouse, Rhipidomys couesi LR/lc
 Broad-footed climbing mouse, Rhipidomys latimanus LR/lc
 White-footed climbing mouse, Rhipidomys leucodactylus LR/lc
 Atlantic Forest climbing mouse, Rhipidomys mastacalis LR/lc
Genus: Scolomys
 South American spiny mouse, Scolomys melanops EN
Genus: Sigmodon
 Unexpected cotton rat, Sigmodon inopinatus LR/lc
 Peruvian cotton rat, Sigmodon peruanus LR/lc
Genus: Sigmodontomys
 Alfaro's rice water rat, Sigmodontomys alfari LR/lc
 Long-tailed sigmodontomys, Sigmodontomys aphrastus DD
Genus: Transandinomys
 Bolivar rice rat, Transandinomys bolivaris LR/lc
 Talamancan rice rat, Transandinomys talamancae LR/lc
Genus: Thomasomys
 Golden Oldfield mouse, Thomasomys aureus LR/lc
 Beady-eyed mouse, Thomasomys baeops LR/lc
 Ashy-bellied Oldfield mouse, Thomasomys cinereiventer LR/lc
 Ash-colored Oldfield mouse, Thomasomys cinereus LR/lc
 Slender Oldfield mouse, Thomasomys gracilis LR/lc
 Paramo Oldfield mouse, Thomasomys paramorum LR/lc
 Thomas's Oldfield mouse, Thomasomys pyrrhonotus LR/lc
 Rhoads's Oldfield mouse, Thomasomys rhoadsi LR/lc
 Forest Oldfield mouse, Thomasomys silvestris LR/lc

Order: Lagomorpha (lagomorphs)

The lagomorphs comprise two families, Leporidae (hares and rabbits), and Ochotonidae (pikas). Though they can resemble rodents, and were classified as a superfamily in that order until the early 20th century, they have since been considered a separate order. They differ from rodents in a number of physical characteristics, such as having four incisors in the upper jaw rather than two.

Family: Leporidae (rabbits, hares)
Genus: Sylvilagus
 Andean tapetí, Sylvilagus andinus DD
Common tapetí, Sylvilagus brasiliensis EN
Ecuadorian tapetí, Sylvilagus daulensis NE
Western tapetí, Sylvilagus surdaster NE

Order: Eulipotyphla (shrews, hedgehogs, moles, and solenodons)

Eulipotyphlans are insectivorous mammals. Shrews and solenodons closely resemble mice, hedgehogs carry spines, while moles are stout-bodied burrowers.

Family: Soricidae (shrews)
Subfamily: Soricinae
Tribe: Blarinini
Genus: Cryptotis
 Ecuadorean small-eared shrew, Cryptotis montivaga LR/lc
 Scaly-footed small-eared shrew, Cryptotis squamipes LR/lc
 Thomas' small-eared shrew, Cryptotis thomasi LR/lc

Order: Chiroptera (bats)

The bats' most distinguishing feature is that their forelimbs are developed as wings, making them the only mammals capable of flight. Bat species account for about 20% of all mammals.

Family: Noctilionidae
Genus: Noctilio
 Lesser bulldog bat, Noctilio albiventris LR/lc
 Greater bulldog bat, Noctilio leporinus LR/lc
Family: Vespertilionidae
Subfamily: Myotinae
Genus: Myotis
 Silver-tipped myotis, Myotis albescens LR/lc
 Hairy-legged myotis, Myotis keaysi LR/lc
 Black myotis, Myotis nigricans LR/lc
 Montane myotis, Myotis oxyotus LR/lc
 Riparian myotis, Myotis riparius LR/lc
 Velvety myotis, Myotis simus LR/lc
Subfamily: Vespertilioninae
Genus: Eptesicus
 Little black serotine, Eptesicus andinus LR/lc
 Brazilian brown bat, Eptesicus brasiliensis LR/lc
 Argentine brown bat, Eptesicus furinalis LR/lc
 Harmless serotine, Eptesicus innoxius VU
Genus: Histiotus
 Small big-eared brown bat, Histiotus montanus LR/lc
Genus: Lasiurus
 Desert red bat, Lasiurus blossevillii LR/lc
 Hoary bat, Lasiurus cinereus LR/lc
 Southern yellow bat, Lasiurus ega LR/lc
Family: Molossidae
Genus: Cynomops
 Greenhall's dog-faced bat, Cynomops greenhalli LR/lc
 Southern dog-faced bat, Cynomops planirostris LR/lc
Genus: Eumops
 Black bonneted bat, Eumops auripendulus LR/lc
 Dwarf bonneted bat, Eumops bonariensis LR/lc
 Wagner's bonneted bat, Eumops glaucinus LR/lc
 Western mastiff bat, Eumops perotis LR/lc
Genus: Molossops
 Equatorial dog-faced bat, Molossops aequatorianus VU
Genus: Molossus
 Black mastiff bat, Molossus ater LR/lc
 Bonda mastiff bat, Molossus bondae LR/lc
 Velvety free-tailed bat, Molossus molossus LR/lc
Genus: Nyctinomops
 Big free-tailed bat, Nyctinomops macrotis LR/lc
Genus: Promops
 Big crested mastiff bat, Promops centralis LR/lc
 Brown mastiff bat, Promops nasutus LR/lc
Genus: Tadarida
 Mexican free-tailed bat, Tadarida brasiliensis LR/nt
Family: Emballonuridae
Genus: Balantiopteryx
 Ecuadorian sac-winged bat, Balantiopteryx infusca EN
Genus: Centronycteris
 Shaggy bat, Centronycteris maximiliani LR/lc
Genus: Diclidurus
 Northern ghost bat, Diclidurus albus LR/lc
Genus: Peropteryx
 Greater dog-like bat, Peropteryx kappleri LR/lc
 Lesser dog-like bat, Peropteryx macrotis LR/lc
Genus: Rhynchonycteris
 Proboscis bat, Rhynchonycteris naso LR/lc
Genus: Saccopteryx
 Greater sac-winged bat, Saccopteryx bilineata LR/lc
 Frosted sac-winged bat, Saccopteryx canescens LR/lc
 Lesser sac-winged bat, Saccopteryx leptura LR/lc
Family: Mormoopidae
Genus: Mormoops
 Ghost-faced bat, Mormoops megalophylla LR/lc
Genus: Pteronotus
 Big naked-backed bat, Pteronotus gymnonotus LR/lc
Family: Phyllostomidae
Subfamily: Phyllostominae
Genus: Glyphonycteris
 Davies's big-eared bat, Glyphonycteris daviesi LR/nt
 Tricolored big-eared bat, Glyphonycteris sylvestris LR/nt
Genus: Lonchorhina
 Tomes's sword-nosed bat, Lonchorhina aurita LR/lc
Genus: Lophostoma
 Pygmy round-eared bat, Lophostoma brasiliense LR/lc
 White-throated round-eared bat, Lophostoma silvicolum LR/lc
Genus: Macrophyllum
 Long-legged bat, Macrophyllum macrophyllum LR/lc
Genus: Micronycteris
 Hairy big-eared bat, Micronycteris hirsuta LR/lc
 Little big-eared bat, Micronycteris megalotis LR/lc
 White-bellied big-eared bat, Micronycteris minuta LR/lc
Genus: Mimon
 Striped hairy-nosed bat, Mimon crenulatum LR/lc
Genus: Phylloderma
 Pale-faced bat, Phylloderma stenops LR/lc
Genus: Phyllostomus
 Pale spear-nosed bat, Phyllostomus discolor LR/lc
 Lesser spear-nosed bat, Phyllostomus elongatus LR/lc
 Greater spear-nosed bat, Phyllostomus hastatus LR/lc
Genus: Trachops
 Fringe-lipped bat, Trachops cirrhosus LR/lc
Genus: Vampyrum
 Spectral bat, Vampyrum spectrum LR/nt
Subfamily: Lonchophyllinae
Genus: Lionycteris
 Chestnut long-tongued bat, Lionycteris spurrelli LR/lc
Genus: Lonchophylla
 Handley's nectar bat, Lonchophylla handleyi VU
 Western nectar bat, Lonchophylla hesperia VU
 Godman's nectar bat, Lonchophylla mordax LR/lc
 Orange nectar bat, Lonchophylla robusta LR/lc
 Thomas's nectar bat, Lonchophylla thomasi LR/lc
Subfamily: Glossophaginae
Genus: Anoura
 Tailed tailless bat, Anoura caudifer LR/lc
 Handley's tailless bat, Anoura cultrata LR/lc
 Geoffroy's tailless bat, Anoura geoffroyi LR/lc
Genus: Choeroniscus
 Minor long-nosed long-tongued bat, Choeroniscus minor LR/lc
 Greater long-tailed bat, Choeroniscus periosus VU
Genus: Glossophaga
 Commissaris's long-tongued bat, Glossophaga commissarisi LR/lc
 Miller's long-tongued bat, Glossophaga longirostris LR/lc
 Pallas's long-tongued bat, Glossophaga soricina LR/lc
Genus: Lichonycteris
 Dark long-tongued bat, Lichonycteris obscura LR/lc
Subfamily: Carolliinae
Genus: Carollia
 Chestnut short-tailed bat, Carollia castanea LR/lc
 Seba's short-tailed bat, Carollia perspicillata LR/lc
Genus: Rhinophylla
 Hairy little fruit bat, Rhinophylla alethina LR/nt
 Fischer's little fruit bat, Rhinophylla fischerae LR/nt
 Dwarf little fruit bat, Rhinophylla pumilio LR/lc
Subfamily: Stenodermatinae
Genus: Artibeus
 Andersen's fruit-eating bat, Artibeus anderseni LR/lc
 Fraternal fruit-eating bat, Artibeus fraterculus VU
 Silver fruit-eating bat, Artibeus glaucus LR/lc
 Jamaican fruit bat, Artibeus jamaicensis LR/lc
 Great fruit-eating bat, Artibeus lituratus LR/lc
 Dark fruit-eating bat, Artibeus obscurus LR/nt
 Pygmy fruit-eating bat, Artibeus phaeotis LR/lc
 Toltec fruit-eating bat, Artibeus toltecus LR/lc
Genus: Chiroderma
 Salvin's big-eyed bat, Chiroderma salvini LR/lc
 Little big-eyed bat, Chiroderma trinitatum LR/lc
 Hairy big-eyed bat, Chiroderma villosum LR/lc
Genus: Enchisthenes
 Velvety fruit-eating bat, Enchisthenes hartii LR/lc
Genus: Mesophylla
 MacConnell's bat, Mesophylla macconnelli LR/lc
Genus: Sturnira
 Aratathomas's yellow-shouldered bat, Sturnira aratathomasi LR/nt
 Bidentate yellow-shouldered bat, Sturnira bidens LR/nt
 Bogota yellow-shouldered bat, Sturnira bogotensis LR/lc
 Hairy yellow-shouldered bat, Sturnira erythromos LR/lc
 Highland yellow-shouldered bat, Sturnira ludovici LR/lc
 Louis's yellow-shouldered bat, Sturnira luisi LR/lc
 Greater yellow-shouldered bat, Sturnira magna LR/nt
 Tilda's yellow-shouldered bat, Sturnira tildae LR/lc
Genus: Uroderma
 Tent-making bat, Uroderma bilobatum LR/lc
 Brown tent-making bat, Uroderma magnirostrum LR/lc
Genus: Vampyressa
 Striped yellow-eared bat, Vampyressa nymphaea LR/lc
 Southern little yellow-eared bat, Vampyressa pusilla LR/lc
Genus: Platyrrhinus
 Short-headed broad-nosed bat, Platyrrhinus brachycephalus LR/lc
 Thomas's broad-nosed bat, Platyrrhinus dorsalis LR/lc
 Heller's broad-nosed bat, Platyrrhinus helleri LR/lc
 Buffy broad-nosed bat, Platyrrhinus infuscus LR/nt
 Greater broad-nosed bat, Platyrrhinus vittatus LR/lc
Subfamily: Desmodontinae
Genus: Desmodus
 Common vampire bat, Desmodus rotundus LR/lc
Genus: Diaemus
 White-winged vampire bat, Diaemus youngi LR/lc
Genus: Diphylla
 Hairy-legged vampire bat, Diphylla ecaudata LR/nt
Family: Furipteridae
Genus: Amorphochilus
 Smokey bat, Amorphochilus schnablii VU
Genus: Furipterus
 Furipteridae, Furipterus horrens LR/lc
Family: Thyropteridae
Genus: Thyroptera
 Peters's disk-winged bat, Thyroptera discifera LR/lc
 Spix's disk-winged bat, Thyroptera tricolor LR/lc

Order: Cetacea (whales)

The order Cetacea includes whales, dolphins and porpoises. They are the mammals most fully adapted to aquatic life with a spindle-shaped nearly hairless body, protected by a thick layer of blubber, and forelimbs and tail modified to provide propulsion underwater.

Suborder: Mysticeti
Family: Balaenopteridae
Subfamily: Balaenopterinae
Genus: Balaenoptera
 Southern minke whale, Balaenoptera bonaerensis LR/nt
 Bryde's whale, Balaenoptera edeni DD 
 Southern sei whale, Balaenoptera borealis schlegelii EN
 Southern fin whale, Balaenoptera physalus quoyi EN
 Southern blue whale, Balaenoptera musculus intermedia EN
Subfamily: Megapterinae
Genus: Megaptera
 Southern humpback whale, Megaptera novaeangliae VU
Suborder: Odontoceti
Family: Kogiidae
Genus: Kogia
 Pygmy sperm whale, Kogia breviceps LR/lc
 Dwarf sperm whale, Kogia sima LR/lc
Family: Ziphidae
Genus: Ziphius
 Cuvier's beaked whale, Ziphius cavirostris DD
Subfamily: Hyperoodontinae
Genus: Mesoplodon
 Blainville's beaked whale, Mesoplodon densirostris DD
 Ginkgo-toothed beaked whale, Mesoplodon ginkgodens DD
 Pygmy beaked whale, Mesoplodon peruvianus DD
Family: Delphinidae (marine dolphins)
Genus: Steno
 Rough-toothed dolphin, Steno bredanensis DD
Genus: Sotalia
 Tucuxi, Sotalia fluviatilis DD
Genus: Stenella
 Spinner dolphin, Stenella longirostris LR/cd
Genus: Delphinus
 Short-beaked common dolphin, Delphinus delphis LR/lc
Genus: Lagenodelphis
 Fraser's dolphin, Lagenodelphis hosei DD
Superfamily: Platanistoidea
Family: Iniidae
Genus: Inia
 Boto, Inia geoffrensis VU
Genus: Feresa
 Pygmy killer whale, Feresa attenuata DD
Genus: Pseudorca
 False killer whale, Pseudorca crassidens LR/lc
Genus: Globicephala
 Short-finned pilot whale, Globicephala macrorhynchus LR/cd
Genus: Orcinus
 Orca, Orcinus orca LR/cd

Order: Carnivora (carnivorans)

Carnivorans include over 260 species, the majority of which eat meat as their primary dietary item. They have a characteristic skull shape and dentition.
Suborder: Feliformia
Family: Felidae (cats)
Subfamily: Felinae
Genus: Leopardus
Pampas cat, L. colocola 
Ocelot, L. pardalis 
Oncilla, L. tigrinus 
Margay, L. wiedii 
Genus: Puma
Cougar, P. concolor 
Genus: Herpailurus
Jaguarundi, H. yagouaroundi 
Subfamily: Pantherinae
Genus: Panthera
Jaguar, P. onca 
Suborder: Caniformia
Family: Canidae (dogs, foxes)
Genus: Lycalopex
 Culpeo, Lycalopex culpaeus LC
 South American gray fox, Lycalopex griseus LC
 Sechura fox, Lycalopex sechurae DD
Genus: Atelocynus
 Short-eared dog, Atelocynus microtis DD
Genus: Speothos
 Bush dog, Speothos venaticus VU
Family: Ursidae (bears)
Genus: Tremarctos
 Spectacled bear, Tremarctos ornatus VU
Family: Procyonidae (raccoons)
Genus: Procyon
 Crab-eating raccoon, Procyon cancrivorus
Genus: Nasua
 South American coati, Nasua nasua
Genus: Nasuella
 Mountain coati, Nasuella olivacea DD
Genus: Potos
 Kinkajou, Potos flavus
Genus: Bassaricyon
 Western lowland olingo, Bassaricyon medius 
 Northern olingo, Bassaricyon gabbii
 Olinguito, Bassaricyon neblina
Family: Mustelidae (mustelids)
Genus: Eira
 Tayra, Eira barbara
Genus: Galictis
 Greater grison, Galictis vittata
Genus: Lontra
 Neotropical river otter, Lontra longicaudis DD
Genus: Neogale
 Amazon weasel, Neogale africana DD
 Colombian weasel, Neogale felipei EN
 Long-tailed weasel, Neogale frenata
Genus: Pteronura
 Giant otter, Pteronura brasiliensis EN
Family: Otariidae (eared seals, sealions)
Genus: Arctocephalus
 Galapagos fur seal, Arctocephalus galapagoensis VU
Genus: Zalophus
 Galápagos sea lion, Zalophus wollebaeki VU
Family: Phocidae (earless seals)
Genus: Mirounga
 Southern elephant seal, M. leonina  vagrant
Family: Mephitidae
Genus: Conepatus
 Striped hog-nosed skunk, Conepatus semistriatus

Order: Perissodactyla (odd-toed ungulates)

The odd-toed ungulates are browsing and grazing mammals. They are usually large to very large, and have relatively simple stomachs and a large middle toe.

Family: Tapiridae (tapirs)
Genus: Tapirus
 Baird's tapir, Tapirus bairdii EN
 Mountain tapir, Tapirus pinchaque EN
 Brazilian tapir, Tapirus terrestris VU

Order: Artiodactyla (even-toed ungulates)

The even-toed ungulates are ungulates whose weight is borne about equally by the third and fourth toes, rather than mostly or entirely by the third as in perissodactyls. There are about 220 artiodactyl species, including many that are of great economic importance to humans.

Family: Tayassuidae (peccaries)
Genus: Dicotyles
 Collared peccary, Dicotyles tajacu LC
Genus: Tayassu
 White-lipped peccary, Tayassu pecari NT
Family: Camelidae (camels, llamas)
Genus: Lama
 Vicuña, L. vicugna LC introduced
Family: Cervidae (deer)
Subfamily: Capreolinae
Genus: Hippocamelus
 Taruca, Hippocamelus antisensis DD
Genus: Mazama
 Red brocket, Mazama americana DD
 Gray brocket, Mazama gouazoupira DD
 Little red brocket, Mazama rufina LR/nt
Genus: Odocoileus
 White-tailed deer, Odocoileus virginianus LR/lc
Genus: Pudu
 Northern pudú, Pudu mephistophiles LR/nt

Infraclass: Metatheria

Order: Didelphimorphia (common opossums)

Didelphimorphia is the order of common opossums of the Western Hemisphere. Opossums probably diverged from the basic South American marsupials in the late Cretaceous or early Paleocene. They are small to medium-sized marsupials, about the size of a large house cat, with a long snout and prehensile tail.

Family: Didelphidae (American opossums)
Subfamily: Caluromyinae
Genus: Caluromys
 Derby's woolly opossum, Caluromys derbianus VU
 Brown-eared woolly opossum, Caluromys lanatus LR/nt
Genus: Glironia
 Bushy-tailed opossum, Glironia venusta VU
Subfamily: Didelphinae
Genus: Chironectes
 Water opossum, Chironectes minimus LR/nt
Genus: Didelphis
 White-eared opossum, Didelphis albiventris LR/lc
 Common opossum, Didelphis marsupialis LR/lc
Genus: Marmosa
 Rufous mouse opossum, Marmosa lepida LR/nt
 Linnaeus's mouse opossum, Marmosa murina LR/lc
 Bare-tailed woolly mouse opossum, Marmosa regina LR/lc
 Robinson's mouse opossum, Marmosa robinsoni LR/lc
 Red mouse opossum, Marmosa rubra LR/lc
Genus: Marmosops
 Tschudi's slender opossum, Marmosops impavidus LR/nt
 White-bellied slender opossum, Marmosops noctivagus LR/lc
Genus: Metachirus
 Brown four-eyed opossum, Metachirus nudicaudatus LR/lc
Genus: Monodelphis
 Sepia short-tailed opossum, Monodelphis adusta LR/lc
Genus: Philander
 Anderson's four-eyed opossum, Philander andersoni LR/lc
 Gray four-eyed opossum, Philander opossum LR/lc

Order: Paucituberculata (shrew opossums)

There are six extant species of shrew opossum. They are small shrew-like marsupials confined to the Andes.

Family: Caenolestidae
Genus: Caenolestes
 Gray-bellied caenolestid, Caenolestes caniventer NT
 Andean caenolestid, Caenolestes condorensis VU
 Northern caenolestid, Caenolestes convelatus VU
 Dusky caenolestid, Caenolestes fuliginosus LC
 Eastern caenolestid, Caenolestes sangay VU

See also
List of chordate orders
List of prehistoric mammals
Lists of mammals by region
Mammal classification
List of mammals described in the 2000s

References

External links

Ecuador
 
Mammals
Ecuador